“The Mongolian Economic Forum” is a NON-PROFIT, NON-POLITICAL and non-governmental organization that was founded in 2010. The founders of the organization are: P. Tsagaan, D. Jargalsaikhan, S. Batbold, D. Zorigt, S. Bayartsogt, Ch. Saikhanbileg, D. Enkhbat, S. Oyun, Ch. Gankhuyag, Yo. Otgonbayar, G. Zandanshatar, Ch. Khashchuluun, and D. Tsogtbaatar.

Mission

The main mission of the forum is to identify policies that promote sustainable development for Mongolia and to generate dialogue amongst leaders such as policy makers, businessmen, scientists, and civil organizations, so that they can reach a consensus on the controversial issues surrounding strategic industries.

History

Mongolian Economic Forum 2010

The Mongolian Economic Forum 2010 was held on 8 and 9 February 2010, under the auspices of the Prime Minister of Mongolia, S. Batbold under the slogan of “Together we can”. Nobel prize-winning economist Hernando De Soto attended as an honorary guest. The first day of the forum focused on the subjects of “Budgetary reforms”, “Development of the mining sector”, “Environment, green economy”. The themes of discussions on the following day were “State registration reforms”, “Capital market reforms”, “Competitiveness”. During the forum, an organization was founded under the name "Mongolian Economic Forum" which is independent of politics, non-governmental with the task of organizing annual economic forum.

Mongolia Economic Forum 2010 sponsor list.

Аjnai corporation, Golomt Bank, World Bank, Oyunii Undraa Holdings, Khan Bank, Khas Bank, MCS Group, Eurasia Capital, Lovells, Newcom Group, Mobicom, Eznis, NC property, Oyu Tolgoi, Petrovis.

Media Sponsors:

Mongolian National Broadcasting, TV5, NTV, Unuudur Newspaper, Zuunii Medee Newspaper, olloo.mn, Gogo Web Portal, Iconcept LLC, EMECA.

Mongolia Economic Forum 2011

The Mongolian Economic Forum 2011 was held between the 2nd to the 4th of March, 2011 under the auspices of the Prime Minister S. Batbold with the slogan “Together in Development” and focused on the following 4 main themes; “Human development”, “Development policy”, “Governance”, “Infrastructure” and had 15 different set of sessions. The highlight of the forum was round table meetings between delegates from the World Economic Forum in civil chamber of the Presidential Office, themes of the roundtable discussions were “Responsible mining”, “Transparency in extraction production”, and “Together against corruption”. Another beneficial aspect of the forum was that the “Invest Mongolia” forum was held together with the Mongolian Economic Forum.

Mongolian Economic Forum 2011 sponsor list.

The Mongolian Government, Peabody, Golomt Bank, Bodi Group, TDB, Khas Bank, Tenger Financial Group, Goldman Sachs, Rio Tinto, MCS, Energy Resources, APU LLC, Petrovis, Newcom Group, Mobicom, BDSEC JSC, Eurasia Capital, Monet Capital, Terelj Hotel, International Financial Corporation, Sound of Mongolia, Oyunii Undraa Holdings.

Mongolian Economic Forum 2012

The Mongolian Economic Forum 2012 was held between the 2nd to the 6th of March, 2012, under the auspices of the Prime Minister S. Batbold. 11 different discussions were conducted around the main topics of “Economic Development: Inclusive Growth”, “Social Policy: Equitable Growth”, “Competitiveness: Innovation and Green Growth”. This year's forum was unique due to the fact that numerous series of discussions and debates were held before the forum under the main themes of the year as a preparation for the forum. The discussions were delivered to the scientists, businessmen, and the society and the feedbacks were applied to the main themes of the year.

Mongolian Economic Forum 2012 sponsor list.

The Mongolian Government, Rio Tinto, Golomt Bank, Khan Bank, TDB, Bodi Group, Newcom Group, Mobicom, Oyu Tolgoi, Petrovis LLC, Peabody Energy, Khas Bank, Tenger Insurance, World Bank, Eurasia Capital, ADB, IFC, Standard Chartered, Ulaanbaatar Railways.

Mongolia Economic Forum 2013

The Mongolian Economic Forum 2013 was held on 4–5 March 2013 under the auspices of Prime Minister N. Altankhuyag under the slogan "Mongolian Brand". The discussions were held within the range of the theme “"Mongolian Brand", which identified and gave numerous critical ideas to diversify the economy from its reliance on the mining sector and overcoming the challenges of being a landlocked country. The plenary sessions were “National Brand and Mongolia’s Development”, “Development financing”, “The labor market and human resources”, “Legal environment”, “Economic diversification”, and “Business environment”. Furthermore, there were three more specials sessions regarding the theme of the year.

Mongolian Economic Forum 2013 sponsor list.

The Mongolian Government, TDB, MAK, Khan Bank, World Bank, ADB, Khas Bank, Tenger Financial Group, MNB, Mongolian Economy Magazine, Bloomberg TV Mongolia, Mobinet, Mongolian Artists Organization.

Mongolian Economic Forum 2014

         The Mongolian Economic Forum 2014 was held on the 24th and 25 March 2014 under the auspices then Prime Minister N. Altankhuyag under the slogan “Made in Mongolia”. The forum covered 34 different breakout sessions. The main discussions went around “Scenarios for Mongolia” and “Development policy and Planning”. During the “Scenarios for Mongolia” discussion, delegates from “The World Economic Forum” (Well known for Davos World Economic Forum) arrived in Mongolia and introduced handout materials and specially made video clip to the audience, which they had created in regards towards the different scenarios that Mongolia could take.

Mongolian Economic Forum 2014 sponsor list.

The Mongolian Government, TDB, Khan Bank, ETT, State Bank, Khas Bank, Golomt Bank, Erdenet, IFC.

Media Sponsors:

Bloomberg TV Mongolia, BRB RENT, Mobinet, Mongolian Economy Magazine, Sound of Mongolia, Mongol Mass Media ХХК.

Mongolian Economic Forum 2015

The Mongolian Economic Forum 2015 was held on the 2nd and 3 April 2015 with the support of the then prime minister Ch. Saikhanbileg under the slogan “Trust”. During the 2 days of the forum, 18 subject discussions were held on the main topics of “Mongolia’s long term vision” and “The current macro state of the Mongolian economy”. One of the defining discussion themes of the forum was how to increase and improve Mongolia's credit rating in the international financial market.

The sponsors for the Mongolian Economic Forum 2015.

The Mongolian Government, Golomt Bank, Khan Bank, Oyu Tolgoi, E&Y, Ard Financial, BCM, Sound of Mongolia, Megaproject Development Institute, Bloomberg TV Mongolia, Union of Mongolian Journalists, Gogo Web Portal, Mongolian Economy Magazine, Government News, Mongolia Business Summit, Cover Mongolia, BRB Media, Oxford Business Group, German Mongolian Business Association, Gereg Magazine.

Mongolian Economic Forum 2016

The Mongolian Economic Forum 2016 was held on the 30th and 31 March 2016 with the support of the then prime minister Ch. Saikhanbileg under the slogan “Lessons, Challenges, and Solutions”. The first day of the forum focused on the topic of “Global and regional economic trends and Mongolia’s economic trajectory”. The main topic for the second day was “Business Environment”. An additional discussion was held on the topic of “The long-term development policy of Mongolia” and was attended by party members of the 5 parties that held seats in the Mongolian parliament. A total of 18 discussions were held during the event. The event also marked the 25th anniversary of Mongolia's membership into the Asian Development Bank and the ADB's South East Asian region director Ayumi Konishi attended the event.

The sponsors for the Mongolian Economic Forum 2016.

The Mongolian Government, ADB, IFC, Erdenet, Golomt Bank, Khan Bank, E&Y, Mongol ID, Bloomberg TV Mongolia, Gogo News Agency, BCM, Mobinet, Sound of Mongolia, Oxford Business Group, National News Corporation, Association of Mongolian Builders, Cover Mongolia, Mongolia Business Summit 2016, Mongolian Economy Magazine, Mongolian Chamber of Commerce, French Mongolian Chamber of Commerce, American Chamber of Commerce, German Mongolian Business Association.

Mongolian Economic Forum 2018

It has been decided that “The Mongolian Economic Forum 2018” will be hosted in 2 stages. On the 28th of March, 2018 the forum discussions were held under the subject of “Spring discussions between the private sector and the Government” with the slogan “lets join forces”. During the forum the Mongolian government introduced their “3 pillared development strategy” to the public and discussions were held on the recently introduced new tax bill.

The main event was held on 21–22 May 2018 under the topic of “Investment”.

Organization 
Headquartered in Ulaanbaatar, Mongolia, the Mongolia Economic Forum is a non-governmental organization and was established in 2010.  The NGO's highest governing body is the Board of Directors.

Chairman of the Mongolia Economic Forum NGO is Пунцагийн Цагаан. Director of the Mongolia Economic Forum NGO is Lakshmi Bodsho. Mongolia Economic Forum NGO's highest governing body is the Board of Directors. The members of the Board of Directors include P. Tsagaan, ; D. Jargalsaikhan, ; D. Zorig, ; S. Bayartsogt,;  S. Saikhanbileg, t; D. Enkhbat, ; S. Oyun, ; Yo. Otgonbayar, ; J. Zandanshatar, ; Ch. Khashchuluun, and D. Tsogtbaatar, State Secretary of the Minister of Foreign Affairs.

Activities

References

External links
 Official website

Organizations based in Ulaanbaatar
Business organizations based in Mongolia